Poznań Garbary railway station is a railway station serving the Garbary area in the city of Poznań, in the Greater Poland Voivodeship, Poland. The station is located on the Warsaw–Kunowice railway, Poznań–Skandawa railway and Poznań–Bydgoszcz railway. The train services are operated by Przewozy Regionalne and Koleje Wielkopolskie.

History
The station was damaged during World War II and was rebuilt in 1946. The station used to be known as Poznań Tama Garbary.

Modernisation
The station was modernised in 2008, which included the installation of lifts, shelters on the platform and a wide tunnel under the tracks. New platforms were built which met European standards.

Train services
The station is served by the following service(s):

Regional services (R) Poznan - Gniezno - Mogilno - Inowroclaw - Bydgoszcz
Regional services (R) Poznan - Gniezno - Mogilno - Inowroclaw - Torun
Regional services (R) Leszno - Poznan
Regional services (KW) Poznan - Wrzesnia - Konin - Kutno
Regional services (KW) Poznan - Gniezno
Regional services (KW) Poznan - Murowana Goślina - Wągrowiec - Gołańcz

Bus services

147
151
160
163
167
174
183
190
911

References

 This article is based upon a translation of the Polish language version as of March 2016.

External links
 

Railway stations in Poland opened in 1888
Garbary
Railway stations in Greater Poland Voivodeship
Railway stations served by Przewozy Regionalne InterRegio